White Rose Hamburg is the name used by researchers after 1945 for a resistance group working against National Socialism in Hamburg. Those involved did not call themselves that, and for the most part they did not see themselves as resistance fighters. The term encompasses several circles of friends and family, some of whom had been in opposition to National Socialism since 1936 and who, following the actions of the White Rose in Munich and their continuation, acted against the Nazi regime and the Second World War from 1942. Although many of the members belonged to an older generation, the group is classified as a youth and student opposition. There were isolated personal contacts with other resistance groups in Hamburg, but cooperation did not materialize. 

Interest in the White Rose movement in Hamburg grew particularly after, in autumn 1942, Traute Lafrenz brought her friends in Hamburg copies of the third leaflet produced by the White Rose group of Munich.

Between 1943 and 1944, the Gestapo arrested more than 30 people from this group and transferred them to prisons and concentration camps. Eight members of this resistance group were murdered by the end of the war or died after being mistreated.

See also

References

External links

Gunther Staudacher: Margaretha Rothe und die Hamburger Weiße Rose, (tr. "Margaretha Rothe and the Hamburg White Rose") Balingen 2022, p. 165.
VVN Hamburg: Streiflichter Hamburger Widerstand, (tr. "Spotlight on Hamburg resistance") Brochure 1948; Excerpt printed in: Ursel Hochmuth (ed.): Candidates of Humanity. Documentation, p. 24.
Menschen, die widerstanden haben. Candidates of Humanity. (tr. "People who resisted. Candidates of Humanity") Hamburger Abendblatt, 27. January 2011.
Politisch Verfolgte in Hamburg 1933–1945 (tr. "Politically persecuted in Hamburg 1933-1945") (Memento dated 18 October 2010, Internet Archive)
Hans-Harald Müller and Joachim Schöberl, "Karl Ludwig Schneider und die Hamburger „Weiße Rose“. Ein Betrag zum Widerstand von Studenten im „Dritten Reich“ " (tr. ""Karl Ludwig Schneider and the Hamburg "White Rose". A contribution to the resistance of students in the Third Reich""), in Eckart Krause, Ludwig Huber, Holger Fischer, Hochschulalltag im „Dritten Reich“. Die Hamburger Universität 1933–1945, t. I, Berlin, Hamburg, 1991, p. 423–437

 
1940s in Hamburg
German resistance to Nazism
German Youth Movement
Political repression in Nazi Germany